Winona is a historic home located near Bridgetown, Northampton County, Virginia. It dates to about 1681, and is a small, -story, brick structure with a gable roof. It measures 32 feet, 6 inches, by 27 feet 6 inches.  It features an exterior end chimney with three free-standing stacks set diagonally on the base.

It was listed on the National Register of Historic Places in 1969.

References

External links
Winona, Hungar Creek, Bridgetown, Northampton County, VA 2 photos and 8 measured drawings at Historic American Buildings Survey

Historic American Buildings Survey in Virginia
Houses on the National Register of Historic Places in Virginia
Houses completed in 1681
Houses in Northampton County, Virginia
National Register of Historic Places in Northampton County, Virginia
1681 establishments in Virginia